= St. Josephs Cove Formation =

Geologic formation in Newfoundland

- Stratigraphic range: Early Ordovician – Late Ordovician
- Type: Formation
- Unit of: Baie d'Espoir Group

Lithology
- Primary: Marine sandstones (siliciclastic)

Location
- Region: Newfoundland
- Country: Canada
- Occurrence of the St. Josephs Cove Formation in southeastern Newfoundland

The St. Josephs Cove Formation is a formation cropping out in Newfoundland.
